Type 99 is a camouflage pattern used by People's Liberation Army of the People's Republic of China.

Type 99 has developed many variants throughout its service, each with different designations and colour variants. For example, there are Type 87, Type 95, and Type 03 patterns.

The main variant is a four-colour woodland pattern with olive, green, yellowish-green and black. Type 99, like many other woodland uniforms with black, has been criticized for its use of this color, but once faded, it becomes dull and subdued, and therefore virtually unnoticeable.

Type 99's style imitates that of the older American M81 Woodland camouflage, in the sense it utilizes a macropattern of four colours for concealment, printed in interlocking, elongated and branching blobs. Type 99 uses a yellowish-green colour for its fourth colour, as opposed to the US pattern's khaki. Type 99 is the camouflage pattern for Type 87 Combat & Training Uniform. The camouflage and uniform is replaced by the digital  Type 07 Combat & Training Uniform.

See also
Camouflage
Military camouflage
List of camouflage patterns

References

External links
 Sino defence

Military camouflage
Camouflage patterns
People's Liberation Army
Military equipment introduced in the 1990s